A Merry Christmas! is an album of Christmas music by the Stan Kenton Orchestra recorded in 1961 and released by Capitol Records. It was reissued as Kenton's Christmas in 1970 by Kenton's own Creative World label.

Reception

The Allmusic review by Matt Collar noted A Merry Christmas is a polyphonic masterpiece that is at once progressive and traditional. ...Featuring Kenton's idiosyncratic style of arranging piercing trumpets over a wooly blanket of trombones and mellophones, this is beautiful, forward-thinking and angular music that addresses both complex classical harmony and Basie-style swing".

Track listing
 "O Tannenbaum" - 1:58
 "The Holly and the Ivy" - 1:52
 "We Three Kings of Orient Are" - 2:14
 "Good King Wenceslas" - 1:45
 "The Twelve Days of Christmas" - 4:07
 "Once in Royal David's City" - 2:04
 "God Rest Ye Merry Gentlemen" - 1:46
 "O Come, All Ye Faithful" - 3:17
 "Angels We Have Heard on High" - 2:11
 "O Holy Night" - 2:10
 "Christmas Medley: Joy to the World/Away in a Manger/The First Noel/We Wish You A Merry Christmas/Silent Night/Hark! The Herald Angels Sing" - 8:24 		
Recorded at Goldwyn Studios in Hollywood, CA on February 21, 1961 (tracks 7-11), March 14, 1961 (tracks 1, 3, 5 & 11) and March 20, 1961 (tracks 2, 4 & 6).

Personnel
Stan Kenton - piano, celeste, conductor
Ernie Bernhardt (tracks 1, 3, 5 & 11), Bud Brisbois, Larry McGuire (tracks 2, 4 & 6), Bob Rolfe, Dalton Smith, Sanford Skinner - trumpet
Bob Fitzpatrick, Paul Heydorff (tracks 1-6 & 11), Tommy Shepard (tracks 7-11) - trombone
Jim Amlotte, Bob Knight (tracks 7-11), Dave Wheeler (tracks 1-6 & 11) - bass trombone 
Joe Burnett (tracks 7-11), Dwight Carver, Keith LaMotte (tracks 1-6 & 11), Gene Roland, Gordon Davison - mellophone
Clive Acker (tracks 1-6 & 11), Albert Pollan (tracks 7-11),  - tuba
Pete Chivily - bass 
Artie Anton (tracks 1-7), Jerry McKenzie (tracks 1-6 & 11) - drums 
Larry Bunker - percussion
Emil Richards - bells, percussion, vibraphone (tracks 1, 3, 5 & 11)
Ralph Carmichael (tracks 1-7 & 9-11), Stan Kenton (track 8)  - arranger

References

1961 Christmas albums
Stan Kenton albums
Capitol Records Christmas albums
Albums conducted by Stan Kenton
Albums arranged by Ralph Carmichael
Jazz Christmas albums
Albums produced by Lee Gillette